Siechenbach may refer to:

Siechenbach (Brenz), a river of Baden-Württemberg, Germany, tributary of the Brenz
Siechenbach (Kollenbach), a river in Beckum, North Rhine-Westphalia, Germany, tributary of the Kollenbach
Siechenbach (Wunsiedel), a river of Bavaria, Germany, tributary of the Röslau near Wunsiedel